The Charles Babbage Premium was an annual award "for an outstanding paper on the design or use of electronic computers".

The award was established in 1959. It was initiated by the British Institution of Radio Engineers, which became the Institution of Electronic and Radio Engineers. In 1988, it merged with the Institution of Electrical Engineers (IEE), which later became the Institution of Engineering and Technology (IET) in 2006. Winners have been announced in journals such as Nuclear Power, Electronic Engineering, British Communications and Electronics, and the Software Engineering Journal.

The Premium was named after the mathematician Charles Babbage FRS (1791–1871), inventor of the Analytical Engine, a design for an early mechanical computer.

The IET now makes separate Premium Awards for papers in each of its journals, named after the journal itself. This includes the IET Software Premium Award, the nearest equivalent to the Charles Babbage Premium Award.

References

1959 establishments in the United Kingdom
Awards established in 1959
British awards
Awards for scholarly publications
Computer science awards
Awards disestablished in 1988
Institution of Engineering and Technology
Premium